Halil Savran (born 20 June 1985) is a Turkish-German footballer who plays as a striker.

Career
Savran, who was born in Wiesbaden, has played for Reinickendorfer Füchse, SV Lichtenberg 47 and Tennis Borussia Berlin. In his last season at TeBe he was the top scorer in the NOFV-Oberliga, with 29 goals. He had scored three more goals against SV Yeşilyurt, but these were stricken from the record when the club went bankrupt. He joined Dynamo in July 2007 and scored on his debut, recording the first goal in the history of the 3. Liga. On 26 May 2010, he left Dynamo Dresden after two years to sign for 1. FC Union Berlin. He signed for Erzgebirge Aue in January 2012.

Personal life
Savran lives in Berlin-Lichtenberg with his family.

References

External links
 
 

1985 births
Living people
Sportspeople from Wiesbaden
German footballers
German people of Turkish descent
Association football forwards
2. Bundesliga players
3. Liga players
Füchse Berlin Reinickendorf players
SV Lichtenberg 47 players
Tennis Borussia Berlin players
Dynamo Dresden players
1. FC Union Berlin players
FC Erzgebirge Aue players
FC Hansa Rostock players
VfL Osnabrück players
Footballers from Hesse